South African steam locomotive tenders were classified by means of type letters and sometimes numbers, while locomotive specifications included a list of permissible tenders which could be used with each engine class.

Railway development
In South Africa, all early mainline railway construction took place working inland from harbours and ports. Construction of these lines began in the years from 1859 to 1887.
 Cape Western – The Cape Town-Wellington line in 1859. 
 Namaqualand – The Port Nolloth-O'okiep line in 1869.
 Cape Midland – The Port Elizabeth-Uitenhage line in 1872.
 Cape Midland – The Swartkops-Alicedale line in 1875.
 Natal – The Durban-Pietermaritzburg line in 1876.
 Cape Eastern – The East London-King William's Town line in 1876.
 Kowie – The Port Alfred-Grahamstown line in 1881.
 Transvaal – The Delagoa Bay-Pretoria line in 1887.

On most of these lines, the first locomotives were tank engines, which were in most instances acquired specifically for use during line construction. The first revenue-earning locomotives, on the other hand, were often tender engines from the outset, most notably on the three systems of the Cape Government Railways (CGR). At the other end of the spectrum and in spite of their inherent limited coal and water capacities, the Natal Government Railways (NGR) struggled on with tank locomotives in mainline service until 1904, before it finally adopted tender locomotives, while the Nederlandsche-Zuid-Afrikaansche Spoorweg-Maatschappij (NZASM) relied exclusively on tank engines for the full duration of its existence.

Early tenders
In 1860, the Cape Town Railway & Dock 0-4-2 of the Cape Town-Wellington Railway was the first tender locomotive type to enter mainline service in South Africa. The first of these came ashore in Cape Town on 20 March of that year. It had a small two-axle tender with a  water capacity.

Early CGR mainline locomotives were tank-and-tender engines with optional tenders, which were usually only used during longer trips. The first of these was the CGR 2nd Class 2-6-2TT, which entered service on all three systems of the CGR in 1875 and 1876. It also used a two-axle tender, with a  coal and a  water capacity.

The first three-axle tenders appeared in South Africa during the following year, also on the CGR, on the two versions of the CGR 1st Class 2-6-0 by Beyer, Peacock and Kitson respectively. Both entered service in 1876.

The first bogie tenders in South Africa were also three-axle vehicles, on the CGR Eastern System's 3rd Class 4-4-0 and 4th Class 4-6-0TT of 1884. Both used the same tender, which had the leading axle mounted in a rigid frame, while the other two axles were mounted in a bogie.

The first proper bogie tenders to enter service in South Africa, with two two-axle bogies, came with the first batch of the CGR 7th Class 4-8-0 of 1892.

Tender type classification
The South African Railways (SAR) era began in 1910, upon the amalgamation of the three former Colonial railways, the CGR, NGR and Central South African Railways (CSAR). Since many tender types are interchangeable between different locomotive classes and types, most South African tender steam locomotives could be equipped with a variety of different tender types, with different coal and water capacities. A tender classification system was therefore adopted by the SAR. Tenders were classified by means of type letters and sometimes numbers, while the specifications of most individual locomotive classes included a list of permissible tender types which could be used with each class.

Tenders of locomotives which were considered obsolete in 1912, when the renumbering of locomotives of the three component railways onto the SAR roster was implemented, were not classified. The type classification is made up of two letters and, when required, a number.

Type letter codes

First letter
The first letter of the tender type indicates the classes of engines to which it can be coupled.

Second letter
The second letter of the tender type, or letter and number, indicate the tender's water capacity.

A number, when added after the letter code, indicates differences between similar tender types, such as function, wheelbase or coal bunker capacity.

Permissible tenders
Tender types other than those specified on each locomotive diagram, were not allowed to be coupled to the engines concerned without the approval of the Chief Civil Engineer. Even in respect of some permissible tenders, it was sometimes necessary to make slight structural alterations before the substitution of a tender with the same initial letter designation could be effected.
 Any alterations to pipes between the engine and tender, if necessary to suit the class of engine concerned, were to be done on the tender only.
 Fallplates between engines and tenders were to be of sufficient length to obviate the plate falling between the buffer beams in the event of drawbar failure, and emergency chains or links had to be adjusted in this regard, where necessary.
 Where necessary, fallplate hinges were to be attached to the engine.
 Special attention had to be paid to drawbar clearance in the drawbar pockets. Where clearance was insufficient, the buffer beam could be cut away within reason, and where clearance was excessive, a suitable packing washer could be inserted under the engine end of the drawbar, while taking care that there was ample clearance between the drawbar and the top of the opening in the tender.
 Any difficulty experienced in coupling any combination of engine and tender, had to be reported to the office of the Chief Mechanical Engineer.

Tenders which had been altered to suit engines fitted with rigid platforms, had to be reserved for such engines only, unless instructed otherwise by the office of the Chief Mechanical Engineer.

Reclassification
Several tender types were reclassified, for various reasons.
 From Type CZ to Type EW2, condensing equipment replaced by a D-shaped water tank.
 From Type ET to Type ET1, bunker enlarged to  coal capacity.
 From Type MP1 to Type MR, alteration to the existing water tank.
 From Type MP1 to Type XP1, alteration to the intermediate and buffing gear.
 From Type MT to Type MT1, bunker enlarged to  coal capacity.
 From Type MT to Type MT2, bunker enlarged to  coal capacity.
 From Type SH to Type SK, rebuilt with a new water tank.
 From Type TJ to Type TL, rebuilt with a new water tank.
 From Type TM to Type TL, rebuilt with a new water tank.
 From Type TM to Type XM1, alteration to the intermediate and buffing gear.
 From Type XC1 to Type XE, rebuilt with a new water tank.
 From Type XD to Type XF, rebuilt with a new water tank.
 From Type XE1 to Type XF, rebuilt with a new water tank.
 From Type ZC to Type ZE, rebuilt with a new water tank.

References

 
Steam locomotive tenders